The California Environmental Quality Act (CEQA) is a California statute passed in 1970 and signed in to law by then-Governor Ronald Reagan, shortly after the United States federal government passed the National Environmental Policy Act (NEPA), to institute a statewide policy of environmental protection. CEQA does not directly regulate land uses, but instead requires state and local agencies within California to follow a protocol of analysis and public disclosure of environmental impacts of proposed projects and, in a departure from NEPA, adopt all feasible measures to mitigate those impacts. CEQA makes environmental protection a mandatory part of every California state and local (public) agency's decision making process. It has also become the basis for numerous lawsuits concerning public and private projects.

CEQA has been criticized for being "abused" (used for reasons  than environmental ones) to block, downsize, delay, or gain other concessions from new development. CEQA has even been used to block or delay projects that have positive environmental impacts, such as solar plants, wind turbines, bike lanes on pre-existing roads, and denser housing. One study found that 85% of CEQA lawsuits were filed by organizations with no record of environmental advocacy and 80% of CEQA lawsuits targeted infill development.  CEQA has also been used to block homeless shelters and affordable housing projects, by businesses to try to block competition, and unions have used CEQA lawsuits or threats thereof to force developers to use union workers. All Governors from 1983 onwards, (George Deukmejian, Pete Wilson, Gray Davis, Arnold Schwarzenegger, and Jerry Brown), as well as current governor Gavin Newsom, have stated that CEQA needs to be reformed.

Policy
The CEQA statute, California Public Resources Code § 21000 et seq., codifies a statewide policy of environmental protection.  According to the act, all state and local agencies must give major consideration to environmental protection in regulating public and private activities, and should not approve projects for which there exist feasible and environmentally superior mitigation measures or alternatives.

CEQA process overview
CEQA mandates actions all state and local agencies must take to advance that policy.  Specifically, for any project under CEQA's jurisdiction with potentially significant environmental impacts, agencies must identify mitigation measures and alternatives by preparing an Environmental Impact Report, and must approve projects with feasible mitigation measures and the environmentally superior alternative. The California Natural Resources Agency promulgates the CEQA Guidelines, California Code of Regulations Title 14 § 15000 et seq., which detail the protocol by which state and local agencies comply with CEQA requirements.  Appendix A of the CEQA Guidelines summarizes this protocol in flowchart form. CEQA originally applied to only public projects, but California Supreme Court interpretation of the statute, as well as later revisions to the wording, have expanded the CEQA's jurisdiction to nearly all projects within California, including those accomplished by private businesses and individuals.  § 21002.1: "Each public agency shall mitigate or avoid the significant effects on the environment of projects that it carries out or approves whenever it is feasible to do so."  For private projects, CEQA applies when a discretionary government permit or other entitlement for use is necessary.

Lead agency and responsible agencies
 Lead Agency: The lead agency is responsible for conducting the CEQA review and has final approval of the project. They are responsible for coordinating with the project applicant, public and associated agencies during the CEQA process. When more than one agency is involved in a project, the agency with primary responsibility for approving a project is the lead agency, for purposes of following the CEQA protocol.  
 Responsible Agency: Other agencies with discretionary approval power over the project are called "responsible agencies." The lead agency has an obligation to consult with these agencies during the CEQA process to ensure their input is accounted for. Responsible agencies often have a vested interest in a specific environmental resource that they are charged with regulating.
 Trustee Agency: An agency with jurisdiction over a resource held in trust for the people.  This agency has no approval power over a project.

Initial study
If a project is not exempt from CEQA, a lead agency can conduct an initial study to preliminarily assess project impacts. Appendix G of the CEQA Guidelines lists types of environmental impacts to consider in checklist form. This initial study guides the lead agency to prepare either a negative declaration, mitigated negative declaration, or environmental impact report depending on the impact assessment. The initial study completion also gives the project applicant opportunity to change their project scope early in the CEQA process if the initial study indicates significant impact(s) are likely. If the lead agency determines the project clearly has significant impacts, they can skip the initial study phase and immediately conduct an Environmental Impact Report.

Thresholds of significance
Under CEQA, every agency in the state "is encouraged to develop and publish thresholds of significance" against which to compare the environmental impacts of projects.  Such thresholds are to be published for public review and supported by substantial evidence before their adoption.  A lead agency will normally consider the environmental impacts of a project to be significant if and only if they exceed established thresholds of significance. According to a 2001 survey, however, few agencies have actually developed thresholds of significance.  The survey's analysts wondered, "if most agencies are not developing thresholds and publishing them for public review, then what criteria are they using?". In absence of thresholds of significance developed independently by lead agencies, impact assessments apply the significant criteria detailed in Appendix G, Environmental Checklist, of the CEQA Statutes and Guidelines, which is produced by the California Office of Planning and Research (OPR). Lead agencies can also defer to authority agencies that publish their recommended guidelines for the resources they regulate. Examples of this include the California Department of Conservation has threshold tests for assessing impacts to agricultural resources using the LESA model, and the Bay Area Air Quality Management District has published guidelines for air quality impacts.

Environmental impact analysis
The lead agency must analyze project impacts to 18 different environmental resource factors detailed in Appendix G during their CEQA review. The next section discusses background and setting for each resource factor; and how lead agencies conduct their analysis and the authority for their significance thresholds for these resources.

Resource factors (in alphabetical order):
Aesthetics
Agriculture and Forestry Resources
Air Quality
Biological Resources
Cultural Resources
Energy
Geology and Soils

Greenhouse Gas Emissions
GHG legislative history; rule making; regulated greenhouse gases and their sources; and GHG CEQA responsible agencies are discussed below. The next section describes the analytical approach to determining if a project has significant GHG impacts using guidelines from two Air Quality Management Districts in California. Finally, mitigation measures recommended by air districts and used on various projects are presented for GHG impact analysis.

Introduction and setting
Greenhouse gas emissions were not required to be analyzed as an impact to the environment when CEQA was originally adopted. Several scientists have since attributed greenhouse gases to climate change and resulting negative impacts to humans and the environment. The Intergovernmental Panel on Climate Change (IPCC) issued a report in 2007 stating that human activities are responsible for increased global temperatures. As a result of these assessments, the California Legislature passed Assembly Bill 32, the Global Warming Solutions Act of 2006 that mandated greenhouse gas emissions be reduced to 1990 levels by 2020. Governor Arnold Schwarzenegger signed Executive Order S-3-05 in June 2005 that declared California is vulnerable to climate change impacts resulting in loss of Sierra snowpack for water supply and rising sea levels threatening coastal real estate and habitat. Governor Arnold Schwarzenegger also signed Executive Order S-21-09 in September 2009 requiring 33% of electricity sold in the California come from renewable resources by 2020 to curb greenhouse gas emissions. This assembly of legislation and evidence of environmental impact led to California enacting requirements for lead agencies to consider greenhouse gas emissions in their CEQA reviews.

California Office of Attorney General sent several comment letters to lead agencies urging them to consider greenhouse gas emissions during their CEQA review. Senate Bill 97 required the Governors Office of Planning and Research to develop and recommend new guidelines to analyze greenhouse gas impacts under CEQA. California's Natural Resources Agency adopted new guidelines on December 31, 2009, requiring lead agencies to analyze greenhouse gas emissions under section 15064.4 during their CEQA review through California.

The major category of greenhouse gas emissions resulting from human activities is carbon dioxide. Several other primary gases also include methane, nitrous oxide, sulfur hexafluoride, perfluorocarbons, and hydrofluorocarbons. Greenhouse gas sources resulting from project construction activities are typically generated from transportation of materials to the project site and petrol based equipment used during construction of the project itself. Stationary sources emit greenhouse gases from a single point source such as a smoke stack. Stationary source examples include coal- or gas-fired power plants, incinerators, refineries, bakeries, or chemical plants. Projects that are not stationary sources such as residential and commercial developments, schools, and related infrastructure can also contribute to increases in greenhouse gases. These projects emit greenhouse gases from sources such as vehicle mileage trips to site, energy to run the facility, and landscape maintenance equipment. Land use conversion can reduce vegetation sequestration of carbon dioxide.

The State Air Resources Board or California Air Resources Board is the state agency charged with monitoring and regulating sources of greenhouse gas emissions under AB32. California's thirty-five local air pollution control districts (APCD's) and air quality management districts (AQMD's) are the agencies primarily responsible for regulating stationary sources of air pollution. These air districts traditionally provide guidance to lead agencies, such as counties, cities and public utilities, on the evaluation of air pollutants under CEQA.

Analysis approach
The lead agency is the public agency which has the principal responsibility for approving a proposed project. The lead agency determines which type of environmental document will be prepared (Mitigated Negative Declaration, Environmental Impact Report, etc.) and has discretion to adopt significance criteria more conservative than those required by CEQA. §15064.4 provides a lead agency discretion to determine which type of analysis approach to utilize for a given project level GHG analysis:

“(1) Use a model or methodology to quantify greenhouse gas emissions resulting from a
project, and which model or methodology to use. The lead agency has discretion to select the model or methodology it considers most appropriate provided it supports its decision with substantial evidence. The lead agency should explain the limitations of the particular model or methodology selected for use; and/or

(2) Rely on a qualitative analysis or performance based standards.”

The lead agency is charged with making a good-faith effort to “describe, calculate, or estimate the amount of greenhouse gas emissions resulting from a project.”

Lifecycle analysis of GHG includes the full aggregate quantity of GHG generated from the extraction, production, distribution and use of energy or fuel. If a lead agency had to complete a GHG lifecycle analysis under CEQA, they would have to quantify GHGs produced not only within the spatial boundary of the project site, but GHGs generated from transportation of products to the site and product supply chain production emissions. Several of these energy emissions could be produced overseas leading to difficulty by the lead agency in verification and enforcement of emission thresholds. CEQA guidance currently does not require lifecycle analysis of GHG emissions since the term is not well defined and too speculative, and the Office of Planning and Research (OPR) removed the term “Life Cycle” from CEQA guidelines in 2010. If any portion of the analysis is considered speculative by the lead agency and not supported by defensible and quantifiable scientific evidence, the impact must be eliminated pursuant to CEQA Guidelines 15145.

Thresholds of significance can be determined by reference of air quality management district CEQA guidelines, although the ultimate discretion for thresholds remains with the lead agency. The Bay Area Air Quality Management District, South Coast Air Quality Management District, and San Joaquin Valley Air Pollution Control District are the only districts to date that have adopted CEQA guidelines. Below are highlights from the BAAQMD and SCAQMD:

Bay Area Air Quality Management District
The Bay Area Air Quality Management District (BAAQMD) typically acts as the responsible agency for setting CEQA air emission thresholds within the San Francisco Bay Area Air Basin. The BAAQMD adopted new guidance on June 2, 2010 to address greenhouse gas emission thresholds related to operational related emissions from stationary sources and projects other than stationary sources. Stationary sources are allowed to emit up to 10,000 metric tons (MT) e/year. Other projects are allowed to emit 1,100 MT of e/yr; 4.6 MT e/SP/yr; or compliance with a qualified greenhouse gas reduction strategy. The BAAQMD has not established construction related emissions thresholds, deferring this responsibility to the CEQA lead agency. Chapter 8.2 of the BAAQMD Air Quality Guidelines recommends lead agencies quantify construction emissions and assess if they conflict with AB 32 goals. BAAQMD also recommends using URBEMIS air modeling software to calculate GHG emissions on land use changing projects, and RoadMod software for linear projects. BAAQMD recommends analysis of operational emissions in the five step process: eliminate greenhouse gas analysis if project attributes do not pass screening criteria, quantify emissions using appropriate models, compare unmitigated emissions with thresholds of significance, implement mitigation measures if project is over thresholds of significance, then compare emissions again with thresholds of significance.

South Coast Air Quality Management District
The South Coast Air Quality Management District has developed a tiered analysis process for determining the significance of project-related GHG emissions. If a project is not categorically or otherwise exempt, and if it cannot be shown that the GHG emissions from the project are within GHG budgets in approved regional plans, then project applicants are required to show that the project GHG emissions are below, or mitigated to less than, the applicable following significance screening level:
10,000 metric tons of e per year for industrial projects; or
3,000 metric tons of e per year for commercial or residential projects

Impact mitigation measures
Lead agencies can implement several different mitigation measures to offset or reduce GHG emissions. The BAAQMD recommends using the following best management practices for construction activities: 15% of project's heavy equipment and transportation fleet run on alternative fuels and/or electricity, recycling or reusing 50% of demolition waste, and using 10% local of building materials. Other measures used to reduce construction emissions include limiting equipment idle time, car pooling, and purchase and retire of offsite carbon credits.

BAAQMD recommends lead agencies mitigate operational emissions by adopting a qualified GHG Reduction Strategy that is consistent with AB 32. This strategy can be incorporated into the lead agency's general plan or programmatic level policy for assessing GHG emissions. The strategy involves assessing “business as usual” current and forecasted emissions to calculate a baseline for reduction. The lead agency then proposes measures to reduce those emissions to meet AB 32 expectations. BAAQMD recommends the project mitigate to the maximum extent feasible before considering offsite mitigation options, and offsite mitigation should be measurable, enforceable, and occur within the nine-county Bay Area.

Hazards and Hazardous Materials
Hydrology and Water Quality
Land Use and Planning
Mineral Resources
Noise
Population and Housing
Public Services
Recreation
Transportation
Tribal Cultural Resources
Utilities and Service Systems
Wildfire
Mandatory Findings of Significance

Level of environmental review
Projects may be exempt from CEQA if they are ministerial in nature, have been exempted by the California Legislature through a statutory exemption, or fall within any of the classes of exemption by category that CEQA recognizes that do not have a significant impact on the environment. If the lead agency determines the project could have no significant environmental impacts after completing an initial study, no EIR will be necessary, but the lead agency must still prepare a Negative Declaration (Neg Dec) that discloses the impact analysis.  If the project could have significant environmental impacts, but the lead agency has incorporated mitigation measures to lower those impacts to less than significant, no EIR will be necessary, but the lead agency must prepare a Mitigated Negative Declaration that demonstrates how all identified significant impacts will be mitigated to below the level of significance. Finally, if the lead agency determines the project may have significant environmental impacts, the lead agency must prepare an EIR.

Ministerial decision
CEQA applies to any action when a project requires discretionary approval by a state or local governmental body.  Projects may also require ministerial permits that must comply with general plans and local ordinances such as building permits or marriage licenses. These decisions cannot be denied and provides the governmental body with no judgement as long as the proponent meets the specifications detailed
in the permit or license requirements. CEQA does not apply when only ministerial approval is necessary.

Statutory exemptions
The California state legislature has, on occasion, abrogated CEQA such that specific projects or types of projects could proceed without an EIR. One such abrogation occurred in October 2009, with the passage of a union-backed law exempting the proposed construction of Los Angeles Stadium from CEQA's requirements.  The abrogation mooted an ongoing lawsuit, brought by eight residents of a neighboring city, challenging the validity of the developer's EIR.  The developer had originally prepared an EIR for a commercial development on the site, then prepared a supplemental EIR to include a proposed 75,000 seat stadium situated within 3,000 feet of homes in that neighboring city; the plaintiffs argued that a single new EIR studying the entire project was required.  State officials said the abrogation ended an abuse of CEQA by individuals seeking to obstruct the project; at the signing ceremony, Governor Arnold Schwarzenegger said he would "terminate the frivolous lawsuit."  A plaintiff in the lawsuit said the abrogation "opens up the door for other developers... to hire lobbyists... and get exemptions from the environmental laws."  An environmental lawyer said that the slow economy would probably encourage developers to seek more abrogations, as legislators become more eager to stimulate job growth.

Categorical exemptions
Several categorical exemptions for projects are listed under Title 14 of the California Code of Regulations, Chapter 3, Article 19. These exemptions cover projects that do pose a significant impact to the environment and fit within the description of the several categories listed under Article 19. A common categorical exemption used by agencies is 15301 for maintenance of existing facilities. Since the project is already built, the project often has no significant new impacts. Agencies do not have to file any CEQA findings for categorically exempt projects. They can be legally challenged by the public on whether the project must undergo CEQA. The lead agency can file a Notice of Exemption (NOE) to trigger a 35-day statute of limitations period for legal challenge or, if no NOE is filed, a 180-day statute of limitations applies.

Negative Declaration (ND) / Mitigated Negative Declaration (MND)
After the initial study is completed, the lead agency can then determine if the project could have a significant impact on the environment. The lead agency must propose mitigation measures to reduce any impacts to less than significant "to the maximum extent feasible." The lead agency then prepares a draft Negative Declaration (ND) or Mitigated Negative Declaration (MND) and publishes the document for public review for at least 21 days. After comments are considered, the lead agency can either recirculate the ND/MND if public comments required the project scope to substantially change, or the lead agency can adopt the document. The Lead agency must file a Notice of Determination (NOD) after adopting the document with a 30-day statute of limitations for legal challenge. If the lead agency is presented with a fair argument that shows substantial evidence of the project having a significant environmental impact after mitigation measures are exhausted, the lead agency is required to prepare an Environmental Impact Report. Thus, in essence, an ND/MND may only be used to satisfy CEQA requirements for projects with no significant unmitigated adverse environmental impacts (ND) or for which all potentially significant adverse impacts have been "avoided, reduced or minimized" to below the threshold of significance (MND). If significant impacts remain, an EIR must be prepared and a Statement of Overriding Considerations are necessary.

Environmental Impact Report (EIR)
According to case law, the environmental impact report (EIR) is at "the heart of CEQA". An EIR serves to inform governmental agencies and the public of a project's environmental impacts.  Further, an EIR is required to propose mitigations and alternatives which may reduce or avoid any significant adverse environmental impacts; as the EIR is considered the heart of CEQA, mitigation and alternatives are considered the heart of the EIR.  One alternative that a lead agency must usually consider is the no project alternative, that is, cancellation of the project, with the future instead unfolding according to existing plans (i.e., the status quo).  Among all the alternatives, the EIR identifies the environmentally superior alternative; if the environmentally superior alternative is the no project alternative, the EIR identifies the environmentally superior alternative among the other alternatives.

The EIR process begins with the circulation of a Notice of Preparation (NOP) which informs the public, responsible agencies, trustee agencies, and the OPR that an EIR will be prepared for a given project. The NOP must include sufficient project description details and likely environmental effects such that agencies and public citizens can provide meaningful comments on the proposed project for analysis in the EIR. The NOP comment period is no shorter than 30 days. After preparation of the draft EIR, a Notice of Completion (NOC) must be submitted to the Office of Planning and Research which includes project location, location of review copies, and public comment review period information. The lead agency must provide public notice of the draft EIR at the same time it issues the NOC. This notice must include the location of any public meetings intended to solicit comments on the draft EIR. If the draft EIR is circulated through the State Clearinghouse, then the public comment period must be 45 days minimum. The lead agency must prepare a final EIR before approving the project. The contents of a final EIR are specified in §15132 of the CEQA guidelines, but responses to draft EIR comments are the focus of the document. The lead agency then certifies the final EIR and issues its findings. Should significant and unavoidable impacts remain after mitigation, a Statement of Overriding Considerations must be prepared. Finally, the lead agency may decide whether or how to approve or carry out the project at which time a notice of determination (NOD) must be filed within five days of approval. Appeal periods and litigation avenues remain after the NOD.

Comparisons to similar laws
Similar laws at the federal and state levels require environmental impact analysis before commencing major projects.

National Environmental Policy Act

NEPA, a United States federal statute passed the year before CEQA, is similar to CEQA in that both statutes set forth a policy of environmental protection, and a protocol by which all agencies in their respective jurisdictions make environmental protection part of their decision making process.

NEPA is narrower in scope than CEQA.  NEPA applies only to projects receiving federal funding or approval by federal agencies, while CEQA applies to projects receiving any form of state or local approval, permit, or oversight.  Thus, development projects in California funded only by private sources and not requiring approval by a federal agency would be exempt from NEPA, but would likely be subject to CEQA.

The environmental impact statement (EIS) required under NEPA and the EIR required under CEQA are similar documents, yet have some crucial differences. For example, under NEPA, an agency can list all reasonable alternatives and their impacts, then choose their preferred project without regard to the severity of its impacts, even if it is more harmful to the environment. Under CEQA, the lead agency is required to mitigate all "significant" adverse environmental impacts to "the maximum extent feasible" and can approve a project only if the agency adopts a Statement of Overriding Considerations detailing the specific overriding economic, legal, social, technological, or other considerations that outweigh the project's significant, unavoidable impacts. If a major federal project, or project using federal funds is seeking approval in California, its lead agency must prepare both an EIS and an EIR, but both can be combined into one document (since the EIS and EIR have the same elements for the most part).  Said document, however, must be processed through both the CEQA and NEPA approval steps.

Laws in other states
As of 2005, fourteen states as well as the District of Columbia have CEQA-style laws requiring impacts be reported for projects. CEQA influenced many of these laws, and New York state's law used CEQA as a foundation. Connecticut's Environmental Policy Act (CEPA) is modeled on CEQA and requires lead agencies to prepare an Environmental Impact Evaluation (EIE) that is very similar in nature to California's EIR. The various state laws are not entirely similar to CEQA, as most only apply to public projects (rather than all public actions, like CEQA) and few have as rigorous review standards.

Litigation

CEQA's broad scope and lack of clear thresholds often lead to litigation, both by groups that support development, and individuals and agencies opposing such development.

CEQA plaintiffs such as community and environmental groups often challenge projects with negative declarations, on the grounds that EIRs should have been carried out.  Litigation also occurs on the grounds that EIRs are too brief or overlooked possible impacts, as there are no guidelines for the length or content of the EIRs.

Plaintiffs also sometimes accuse developers of a practice called piece-mealing, by which projects are analyzed incrementally by parts to make the environmental impacts appear smaller to the overseeing agency.

CEQA plaintiffs succeeded on one such claim in June 2009, concerning an expansion of the Chevron Richmond Refinery, the largest employer in Richmond, California.  The judge ruled that Chevron erred by defining the project inconsistently, and the city of Richmond erred in allowing Chevron to piece-meal its project, and in allowing Chevron to develop a mitigation plan after the project begins.  The judge consequently ruled the EIR to be insufficient to meet CEQA's requirements, ordering the preparation of a new EIR covering the whole, accurately defined project before the refinery's expansion could proceed.

Settlements
Plaintiffs in CEQA lawsuits seek various forms of redress, such as amending the EIR, preparing a new EIR, agreeing to mitigation measures, or paying money to local agencies to offset environmental impacts.

Criticisms

CEQA lawsuits (and threats of CEQA lawsuits) are frequently used by groups that want to block a proposed project for reasons  than its environmental impacts.

Carol Galante, a professor of Affordable Housing and Urban Policy at the Terner Center for Housing Innovation at UC Berkeley, who served in the Obama Administration as the Assistant Secretary at the U.S. Department of Housing and Urban Development (HUD),
stated that “It (CEQA) has been abused in this state for 30 years by people who use it when it has nothing to do with an environmental reason, ... NIMBY-ism is connected to the fact that for everyone who owns their little piece of the dream, there&apos;s no reason to want development next door to them, CEQA gives them a tool to effectuate their interest ... We need to fundamentally rethink how the CEQA process works in this state." 

CEQA has been used by residents in San Francisco and Los Angeles to attempt to block homeless shelters and affordable housing projects from being located in their neighborhoods.

A 2015 study by Jennifer Hernandez and others at the environmental and land-use law firm Holland & Knight,
looking at all CEQA lawsuits filed during the three-year period 2010-2012, found that less than 15% were filed by groups with prior records of environmental advocacy. (such as the Sierra Club)

While environmental groups largely agree that building dense housing in urban areas ("infill development") is better for the environment than converting open space to new homes, 4 out of 5 CEQA lawsuits target infill development projects; only 20% of CEQA lawsuits target "greenfield" projects that would convert open space to housing.

A report by the California Legislative Analyst's Office found that in the state's 10 largest cities, CEQA appeals delayed projects by an average of two and a half years.

CEQA's requirement that automobile congestion be considered as an "environmental impact" that must be mitigated has resulted in the law both preventing the creation of bicycle lanes on already existing streets,

as well as allowing lawsuits challenging new bike lanes both before and even after they have passed environmental review and been created.

In one case, anti-abortion activists filed a CEQA lawsuit to try to block a new tenant (Planned Parenthood) from using an already constructed office building in South San Francisco. They cited the noise caused by their own protests as the environmental impact requiring mitigation.  This lawsuit delayed the new tenancy by at least 18 months.
 

Labor unions file CEQA lawsuits against projects to try to force them to pay prevailing wage.

In 2022, the potential environmental impact of a larger incoming undergraduate class, combined with lack of timely environmental review, resulted in a successful lawsuit and court injuction against UC Berkeley. The university said it might have to rescind admission to about a third of its incoming students, but in the end successfully lobbied the state legislature to modify the law to give it more time to perform the required review.

In 2022, CEQA was successfully used by NIMBYs to block the creation of 500 homes on a Nordstroms valet parking lot next to a Bay Area Rapid Transit station in San Francisco.

Use by businesses to attempt to block competition
Businesses have used the law to try to block competition.  In one case a developer (Olen Properties Corp - owned by Igor Olenicoff) sued under CEQA to try to prevent another developer from building a 300 unit apartment complex adjacent to Olen's buildings. 

In another case, Conquest Student Housing, which owns 17 residential rental buildings near USC, sued competitor Urban Partners using CEQA to stop their development of a new 1,600 unit housing complex. Conquest then proceeded to file similar lawsuits against other projects by Urban Partners in other state locations and one in Washington state under that state's environmental law, but dropped their lawsuits after Urban Partners responded with a federal racketeering lawsuit.

In another example in San Jose, when the Moe’s Stop gas station added an additional island with four more pumps, they were sued under CEQA by the competing gas station on the same street corner, Gas & Shop, who claimed that the negative environmental impact would be increased traffic, even though the City had approved the project.

Governors' statements

In 2010, in his signing message for two minor CEQA reform laws, Governor Arnold Schwarzenegger said:

Governor Jerry Brown, in an interview with UCLA's Blueprint magazine, commented on the use of CEQA for other than environmental reasons: 

In 2023, after an appeals court blocked construction of additional student housing at UC Berkeley stating that it would have environmental impacts which require mitigation, Governor Gavin Newsom stated:

See also
California Environmental Protection Agency

References

Further reading
 Fulton, W; Shigley, P Guide to California Planning Third Edition, (2005) Point Arena, California 
 CEQA at 40: A look back, and ahead—materials from a conference held at UC Davis School of Law, November 4, 2011
 Cecily Talbert Barclay; Daniel J Curtin; Matthew S Gray California Land Use and Planning Law, (2012) Point Arena, California

External links
 California Natural Resources Agency, CEQA site 
 Governor's Office of Planning and Research, CEQA site

Environmental Quality Act, California
United States state environmental legislation
Environment of California
1970 in law
1970 in California
1970 in the environment
Environmental impact in the United States